José Santa Cruz (born 3 June 1954) is a Cuban athlete. He competed in the men's discus throw at the 1980 Summer Olympics.

References

1954 births
Living people
Athletes (track and field) at the 1980 Summer Olympics
Cuban male discus throwers
Olympic athletes of Cuba
Place of birth missing (living people)